Gordon Johnston may refer to:

Gordon Johnston (politician) (1920–2005), politician in Manitoba, Canada
Gordon Johnston (soldier) (1874–1934), football player, coach and soldier
Gordon Johnston (field hockey) (born 1993), Canadian field hockey player

See also
Camp Gordon Johnston, World War II training center
Gordon Johnson (disambiguation)